The Portland Rose Festival is an annual civic festival held during the month of June in Portland, Oregon.  It is organized by the volunteer non-profit Portland Rose Festival Association with the purpose of promoting the Portland region.  It includes three separate parades, along with a number of other activities.

History
The Portland Rose Society, founded by Georgiana Pittock and friends in 1888, began with a backyard rose show in Pittock's garden. The annual fundraising event drew more crowds each year. By 1904, the rose society was hosting its annual rose show along with additional festivities, including a parade and pageant.  In 1905, Portland Mayor Harry Lane is remembered for his rousing speech at the Lewis and Clark Exposition, telling the large crowd that Portland needed a "festival of roses". In 1906, the first Rose Festival and Flower Parade was held in Portland. Pittock and neighbors contributed roses from their gardens to decorate floats, wagons, people and horses for the parade. In 1907, Portland hosted its first official Portland Rose Festival.

The Grand Floral Parade is the centerpiece of the festival and the second largest all-floral parade in the United States after the Tournament of Roses Parade. More than 500,000 spectators line the route, making this flower parade the largest single-day spectator event in Oregon. The first parade, in 1907, was called the Rose Carnival, but eventually came to be known as the Rose Festival Parade and later still the Grand Floral Parade.  The 1907 festival also included an "electric parade" with illuminated floats; this evolved into the Merrykhana Parade but after a two-season suspension was renamed the Starlight Parade in 1976.

Since 1930 a queen has been selected from a court of high school seniors from each school in the area. The members of the court are called princesses. For a brief period starting in 1997 they were officially called "ambassadors", but the term "princesses" was reinstated in January 2007. A college scholarship is awarded to a 14-member "royalty". Starting in 2009, the Rose Festival Foundation opened one place on the court to someone from a school outside the Portland city limits.
There are drivers for the Princesses, who are chosen from each high school. The first African American driver (escort) was Sam Whitney from Benson High School in 1954. 
A Junior Rose Festival, focused on children, began unofficially in 1921, on the city's east side, and included its own parade and junior court. It became an official part of the Rose Festival in 1936.  The festival's annual Junior Parade takes place in the city's Hollywood district.  The Junior Parade has grown to an event involving nearly 10,000 children, making it the world's largest parade for children.

During Fleet Week, ships from United States Navy, Coast Guard, Army Corps of Engineers and the Royal Canadian Navy dock along the seawall of Tom McCall Waterfront Park.

The festival also hosts the Starlight Parade, a fireworks display, and carnival rides along the Portland waterfront, among other events.  Dragon boat races on the Willamette River have been included every year since 1989.

The Golden Rose Ski Classic is an annual ski race originating in 1936.  It is the oldest known organized ski race in America, and is the only USSA-sanctioned summer race.

An air show was added to the Rose Festival in 1988 and remained part of the festival through 2002.  Held at the Hillsboro Airport, it was named the Rose Festival Air Show, with the name generally preceded by a sponsor's name, but after the 2002 and 15th show the Rose Festival Association decided to discontinue its relationship with the event. In 2003, the show was reorganized as the Oregon International Air Show, with different sponsors and no longer a Rose Festival event.

No festival was held in 1917 and 1918 because of World War I or from 1942 through 1945 because of World War II. From 2007 to 2016, the festival began with the 82nd Avenue of Roses Parade. The parade was cancelled in 2017, but returned in 2018. COVID-19 pandemic concerns canceled the 2020 and 2021 parades, but the parade would return in 2022.

Awards
 2007, 2011:  the International Festivals and Events Association named the Portland Rose Festival the best in the world

See also
Portland Gold Medal
Royal Rosarians

References

External links

 Official site

1907 establishments in Oregon
Annual events in Portland, Oregon
Festivals in Portland, Oregon
Parades in the United States
Recurring events established in 1907
June events
Flower festivals in the United States
Festivals established in 1907
Tom McCall Waterfront Park